Nina Wadia  (born 18 December 1968) is a British actress and comedian. She is known for portraying Zainab Masood in the BBC soap opera EastEnders, Aunty Noor  in Citizen Khan, Mrs Hussein in the BBC comedy Still Open All Hours and for starring in the BBC Two sketch show Goodness Gracious Me. Additionally, Wadia appeared in the Hindi-language romantic comedy Namaste London in 2007. She also appeared in the series Origin in 2018.

Early life
Wadia was born on 18 December 1968 in Bombay, India and is of Parsi ancestry. She has an older brother and older sister; both of her parents have died. When Wadia was nine years old she moved to Hong Kong and was a student at Island School, Hong Kong.

Career

Television and film
Wadia first came to prominence in BBC sketch show Goodness Gracious Me, playing characters such as Mrs "I can make it at home for nothing!" and one half of The Competitive Mothers. She took over from her Goodness Gracious Me co-star, Meera Syal, in the role of Rupinder in the sitcom All About Me alongside Jasper Carrott and Natalia Kills. In 2007, Wadia was cast as Zainab Masood in the long-running BBC soap opera EastEnders. Her last appearance as Zainab in EastEnders was on 8 February 2013. She also had a minor role in EastEnders in 1994, playing a nurse named Viv who treated Michelle Fowler (Susan Tully) when she was hospitalised with a gunshot wound. She also appears as Zainab in the 2010 spin-off EastEnders: E20.

Wadia has also made several guest appearances in various British comedies and dramas, such as 2point4 Children, The Vicar of Dibley, Thin Ice Chambers, Holby City, Murder in Mind, Doctors and New Tricks. She was a regular presenter on the ITV topical chat show, Loose Women (2005–2006). Wadia also appeared in the E4 teen drama Skins, playing the mother of Anwar Kharral, and, in March 2008, she appeared in the BBC Three drama West 10 LDN. Wadia played the wedding caterer in the comedy film Bend It Like Beckham.

She played a role as the housekeeper in the film I Can't Think Straight, directed by Shamim Sarif. The film revolves about two women from Indian and Palestinian upper-class immigrant communities in the UK who fall in love, and Wadia is the housekeeper who rebels at her high-handed Palestinian employer in small ways. She also had a minor part in the film Code 46 (2003). She starred in a BFI/BBC film Sixth Happiness along with Firdaus Kanga in 1997. The film explores sexuality, disability and the Parsees, a small westernised minority in India, of which Wadia herself is a member. She has also starred alongside Rishi Kapoor playing his wife in a Bollywood film titled Namaste London. She voices the title role in Ethelbert the Tiger – a children's programme. She also had a role in Doctor Who as a doctor in the episode "The Eleventh Hour".

In July 2013, Wadia appeared in All Star Mr & Mrs. In September 2013, she appeared in ITV's Big Star's Little Star. Since December 2013, Wadia has starred in Still Open All Hours as Mrs Hussein. In January 2015, it was announced that Wadia would have a guest role in Holby City, as an established neurosurgeon Annabelle Cooper. The role will be for five episodes. In April 2017, she appeared as Khadija in Finding Fatimah, a British romantic comedy. In 2019, as a last minute casting call, and in "More of a Cameo" as Wadia said, she played the minor part of "Zulla" in the live action remake of Aladdin directed by Guy Ritchie. In 2020, she appeared in the role of Anna Masani in the ninth season of the popular BBC drama series Death in Paradise. Also in 2020, she had a small part in the fifteen minute drama Isolation Stories alongside Sheridan Smith which was filmed via webcam due to the COVID-19 pandemic in the United Kingdom.

From September 2021, Wadia was a contestant for the nineteenth series of Strictly Come Dancing, paired with professional dancer Neil Jones. The couple were the first to be eliminated, in the second week.

In February 2023, Wadia appeared in an episode of BBC Four's  Spring Walks, exploring Swaledale in North Yorkshire..

Stage and radio
Apart from the original radio version of Goodness Gracious Me, Wadia's other radio work includes guesting on Parsons and Naylor's Pull-Out Sections, as well as regular appearances in the BBC World Service soap opera Westway as the pharmacist Namita ul-Haq. In 2001, Wadia voiced the role of Ariel in a BBC Radio 3 production of The Tempest. In 2002, she was due to star in the Royal Shakespeare Company's production of Midnight's Children, based on Salman Rushdie's novel, but she quit only weeks before rehearsals were due to begin. There were rumours that her departure was prompted by offers of more lucrative and less demanding television work, although her agent denied this.

Personal life
Wadia is married to the composer Raiomond Mirza. The couple first met in Canada and married there in July 1998. They live in Surrey, England. Like Wadia, Mirza is a Parsi and the couple had a traditional Parsi wedding.

Charity 
Wadia was involved in the Pakistan Earthquake Appeal Concert and Fashion Show, at the Royal Albert Hall in 2005. She has also been involved in campaigning for Save the Children and for increased organ donation from Asians in Britain.
As a JDRF (Juvenile Diabetes Research Foundation) Ambassador Nina Wadia received an OBE in the 2021 New Year Honours for her services to charity and entertainment.

Honours and awards 
Wadia won 'Best Comedy Performance' at the 2009 British Soap Awards. Additionally she won Best Onscreen Partnership at the same awards ceremony for her onscreen relationship with Nitin Ganatra. In 2004, she won the chairman's Award at the Asian Women awards.

In April 2013, she was awarded with the Outstanding Achievement in Television Award at The Asian Awards.

Wadia was appointed Officer of the Order of the British Empire (OBE) in the 2021 New Year Honours for services to entertainment and charity.

Filmography

Television

Film

References

External links

1968 births
Living people
English film actresses
English radio actresses
English soap opera actresses
English stage actresses
English television actresses
Actresses from Mumbai
English people of Parsi descent
English Zoroastrians
Indian emigrants to England
British actresses of Indian descent
English expatriates in India
Actresses in Hindi cinema
British expatriate actresses in India
European actresses in India
People educated at Notting Hill & Ealing High School
People educated at Island School
20th-century English comedians
21st-century English comedians
Naturalised citizens of the United Kingdom
Officers of the Order of the British Empire
20th-century English women
20th-century English people
21st-century English women